The Dame Edna Treatment is a British talk show created by Barry Humphries and starring his fictional characters Dame Edna Everage and Sir Les Patterson. It aired on ITV at various times. The theme tune was written and performed by Robin Gibb. It was based upon the 1997 British talk show Dr Dame Edna Kisses It Better. It is set in Dame Edna's health-spa, where her celebrity guests have come for some "treatment". Viewing figures varied from 2.5m according to Digital Spy.

Guests

Viewing Figures

References

External links

The Dame Edna Treatment opening sequence at YouTube

2000s British television talk shows
2007 British television series debuts
2007 British television series endings
Barry Humphries
British television talk shows
ITV (TV network) original programming
Television series by Banijay
Television series by Tiger Aspect Productions